The Cathedral Basilica of Saint Francis of Assisi, commonly known as Saint Francis Cathedral, is a Roman Catholic cathedral in downtown Santa Fe, New Mexico. It is the mother church of the Archdiocese of Santa Fe.

The cathedral was built by Archbishop Jean Baptiste Lamy between 1869 and 1886 on the site of an older adobe church, La Parroquia (built in 1714–1717). An older church on the same site, built in 1626, was destroyed in the 1680 Pueblo Revolt. The new cathedral was built around La Parroquia, which was dismantled once the new construction was complete. A small chapel on the north side of the cathedral was kept from the old church.

Influenced by the French-born Archbishop Lamy and in dramatic contrast to the surrounding adobe structures, Saint Francis Cathedral was designed in the Romanesque Revival style. As such, the cathedral features characteristic round arches separated by Corinthian columns and truncated square towers. The large rose window in front and those of the Twelve Apostles in the lateral nave windows were imported from Clermont-Ferrand in France. The towers were originally planned to be topped with dramatic  steeples, but due to lack of funds, these were never built. The north tower is a single row of bricks taller than the south tower. The cathedral was built from yellow limestone blocks quarried near the present site of Lamy. A 2005 addition to the upper façade of the cathedral is a small, round window featuring a dove, the symbol of the Holy Spirit. It is a stained glass replica of the translucent alabaster window designed in the 17th century by the Italian artist Bernini for St. Peter's Basilica in Vatican City.

The Cathedral of Saint Francis of Assisi was officially elevated to a basilica by Pope Benedict XVI on October 4, 2005.

Outside portico

St. Francis of Assisi
This statue of St. Francis, the patron saint of the diocese, was installed at the cathedral during the 1967 renovations.

Saint Kateri
Kateri Tekakwitha (1656–1680) is the first North American Indian to be beatified, and was canonized in October 2012. She was an Algonquian-Mohawk woman of New York State who converted to Christianity at an early age. The statue was created by Estella Loretto, a sculptor from the nearby Jemez Pueblo, and installed in August 2003. A plaque noting Kateri's canonization was added in October 2012.

Jean-Baptiste Lamy
A bronze statue by Jeno Juszko honors Father Lamy (1814–1888), who was installed as the first bishop of the Diocese of Santa Fe in 1850. Under his direction, the cornerstone of the current cathedral was laid in 1869. He became archbishop in 1875, when the diocese was raised to an archdiocese. He retired in July 1885 to his residence north of town, known as Bishop's Lodge. He is buried in the crypt beneath the cathedral floor. The statue was dedicated in 1915.

Stations of the Cross Prayer Garden
Fourteen life-size sculptures by Gib Singleton represent stages during the events in the hours leading up to Jesus' crucifixion as developed by St. Francis of Assisi. The Prayer Garden is sited in the remnant of Bishop Lamy's once-extensive gardens on the cathedral grounds.

West front
Keystone
The keystone in the arch above the main entrance contains a triangle with the Tetragrammaton in Hebrew carved in it. An "old story" printed in The Fabulous Frontier, 1846-1912 alleges that this was Fr. Lamy's way of thanking local Jewish merchants for their financial contributions towards the building of the cathedral. Although there is evidence that Jewish merchants in Santa Fe helped fund the building, there are other examples of the Catholic Church using Hebrew symbols outside of Santa Fe that cast doubt on this story's credibility. The specific representation of the Tetragrammaton inside a triangle symbolizing the Trinity can be found in several Catholic churches in Europe, including Goya's fresco Adoration of the Name of God in the Cathedral-Basilica of Our Lady of the Pillar in Zaragoza.

Bronze doors
During the restoration of 1986, new doors were created, each with ten bronze panels that portray events in the history of the church in Santa Fe. Donna Quasthoff was the commissioned sculptor.

Interior

Nave
The baptismal font is in the center of the nave. Made of Brazilian granite, it was dedicated on June 3, 2001, by Most Rev. Michael J. Sheehan. The eight-sided form represents the 8th day, or Easter, marking God's New Creation through the resurrection of Jesus Christ. The basin is a cruciform, with three steps representative of the 3 days between Jesus' crucifixion and his resurrection. The rill symbolizes the four Evangelists, who cast their nets to catch men. Its location directly between the doors and the altar is representative of the faith journey. To the south is the Ambry Cabinet, containing the oils used in the sacraments. To the north is the Easter Candle stand.

Surrounding the nave along the walls are the Stations of the Cross. The original artwork was done in New Mexico Mission Style. The French archbishops gradually removed the art and painted the walls white. In 1997, the current archbishop began to have the interior restored as it was historically. The Stations are created in Santero style by Marie Romero Cash. Roberto Montoya, a Penitent, carved the Spanish-style frames.

La Conquistadora Chapel
La Conquistadora Chapel occupies the north transept of the cathedral and is the oldest part of the building, having been incorporated from the previous Parroquia. It was built around 1717, about the same time San Miguel Mission was being rebuilt, and shares similar features. The chapel houses La Conquistadora, a wooden Madonna which was brought to New Mexico by Alonso de Benavides in 1626. The statue was removed in 1680 when the Spanish fled the Pueblo Revolt and then returned in 1693 during the Reconquista, when it was given the name "La Conquistadora".

Behind the statue is a carved and gilded wooden reredos with oil paintings depicting various saints. The reredos consists of two altar sections dating from the mid-1700s which were salvaged from the old Parroquia. The pieces, previously used as side altars in the main cathedral, were restored in 1957 and stacked one on top of the other to form a reredos for the chapel. The seven oil paintings also date from the 1700s. Four of them are attributed to Miguel Cabrera, one of the most important Mexican painters of the Baroque period, after a restoration of the paintings in 1976 uncovered Cabrera's signature. During a recent (2000–2009) restoration, an older painting was found. On the left are the coffins of two early Franciscan priests. The chapel is listed as a "contributing property" of the Santa Fe Historic District.

Blessed Sacrament Chapel
The chapel is reserved for prayer. The window wall along the south transept was added during the 1986 renovations. Etched into the glass are depictions of the Apostles and the Holy Family, by the artist Andrea Bacigalupa. The stained glass windows in the chapel were made in France and represent the Eucharist.

Sanctuary
Located in the east end of the nave is the sanctuary. Above the altar is the San Damiano Crucifix, a replica of the crucifix in Assisi, Italy. Tradition says that the Lord leaned down from the crucifix and said; "Francis, go and repair my house."

The altar screen, a reredos, was created for the 100th anniversary of the cathedral in 1986. In the center is an 18th-century statue of St. Francis. He is surrounded by painted images of saints of the New World.

Directly behind the sanctuary is the entrance to the crypt. The sanctuary was redesigned in 1986 in accordance with changes in the liturgical worship. The Archbishop's chair is located to the north, next to a pillar.

Cultural references
A fictionalized account of the cathedral's origins is included in Willa Cather's Death Comes for the Archbishop. Due to its prominent location off the plaza, many artists who have lived in or visited Santa Fe have captured its image in their work.

See also
 List of churches in the Roman Catholic Archdiocese of Santa Fe
 List of Catholic cathedrals in the United States
 List of cathedrals in the United States

References

External links

 Official Cathedral Site

Roman Catholic churches completed in 1887
Francis of Assisi Santa Fe
Francis of Assisi Santa Fe
Francis of Assisi Santa Fe
Roman Catholic Archdiocese of Santa Fe
Roman Catholic churches in Santa Fe, New Mexico
Churches on the National Register of Historic Places in New Mexico
Historic district contributing properties in New Mexico
Cathedrals in New Mexico
National Register of Historic Places in Santa Fe, New Mexico
19th-century Roman Catholic church buildings in the United States